Cathryn Boch (born 1968, Strasbourg), is a French award-winning artist who lives and works in Marseille. She won Drawing Now Prize in 2014. She obtained many residencies abroad and exhibited at key galleries and museums, including MAMCO Geneva in 2009.

Life 
Cathryn Boch was born in Strasbourg in 1968. She graduated from University of Strasbourg in 1990, receiving General Academic Studies Degree (D.E.U.G.) in History of Art. Later she received National Diploma of Plastic Art Studies (1994) and National Superior Diploma of Plastic Expression (1996) from Graduate School of Decorative Arts of Strasbourg.  In 2002-2003 Boch also completed Visual Art training (C.F.P.I) at Graduate School of Decorative Arts of Strasbourg.

In 2014 she won Drawing Now Prize. Between 1995 and 2001 Boch was one of four artists known as the group “Les Pisseuses” who chalked exquisite corpses on the walls of Strasbourg.

Art 
Boch uses road maps, aerial views, topographic surveys and entire iconography of locating, measing and recording the territory as a raw material for her artworks. As a painter she mixes the colors on her palette to get the desired tone, like a sculptor she takes pieces of the material to give the substance a form. She calls the job she is doing “drawing”: she works with the paper, touching it, sanding, scraping and piercing, until the drawing is revealed in layers. Manipulating maps with hand sewing, she creates sculptural topography. The tension of the threads hardens the folds and paper turns into sculpture, reinforced with a frosting of sugar or varnish. Tension of the material is used as a metaphor of world's tension shaken by migratory crisis, rise of extremes, wars and global warming. For Boch, born in Alsace border region of parents from both countries, geographical borders in her works is a paradoxical space, both marginal and central, a space of closure and encounter.

Boch's work was featured in numerous exhibitions at key galleries and museums, including the Galerie Christian Berst, Paris and the Galerie Sébastien Bertrand, Rue de l'Evêché among others. Her works are in public collections of Frac Picardie and PACA, Municipal Fund of the City of Paris (FMAC) and the Georges Pompidou Center, as well as in several renowned private collections.

Exhibitions

Solo exhibitions 
 2019 - Reverse, Galerie Papillon, Paris 
 2016 - Monads, Galerie Papillon, Paris
 2015 - N 48 ° 51 '47' 'E 2 ° 21'24' ', The Observatory, BHV Marais, Paris
 2015 - N 43 ° 18 '21.5' 'E 5 ° 22'03.0' ', Experimental Tray, FRAC Paca, Marseille
 2014 - Saint Germain des Prés course, La Perla, Paris
 2014 - Cathryn Boch, Sébastien Bertrand Gallery, Geneva, Switzerland
 2013 - N ° 48 ° 51 '47' 'E 2 ° 21'24' ', Claudine Papillon Gallery, Paris 
 2012 - Shameless Modesty, Galerie Sébastien Bertrand, Geneva, Switzerland
 2010 - Ent 10 12 9 lassen, Anne de Villepoix Gallery, Paris
 2009 - 10 8 6 überholen, Commissioner Christian Bernard in the context of the cycle "The kind of thing melancholy ", MAMCO, Geneva, Switzerland
 2008 - Oriented drawing, Galerie Anne de Villepoix, Paris
 2007 - With each step one stumbles ..., Center of Art of CEAAC, Strasbourg
 2006 - Project room "Drawings", Galerie Anne de Villepoix, Paris
 2006 - Basanaviviaus j-3, French Embassy, Vilnius, Lithuania

Group exhibitions (selected) 
 2019 - Mare Nostrum. Mediterranean Identities, Villa Datris, Espace Monte Cristo, Paris
 2019 - Memories of travel. The collection of Antoine de Galbert, Grenoble Museum, Grenoble
 2018 - Soft Power, Pallet Truck, Bourges
 2017 - Paratissima13, Caserma La Marmora, Turin, Italy
 2017 - Inextricabilia, magic entanglements, La Maison Rouge, Paris
 2016 - Between the lines, Art Zone, Strasbourg
 2016 - The drawn contemporary, Museum of Decorative Arts, Paris
 2015 - Either 10 years, Interior States, Galerie Christian Berst, Paris
 2015 - Works on paper, Sébastien Bertrand Gallery, Geneva, Switzerland
 2015 - Feel Paris, Lelege Art Gallery, Beijing, China
 2014 - Choices, Palace of Fine Arts, Paris
 2013 - Drawings - Faux drawings, Galerie Papillon, Paris
 2013 - Donation Daniel and Florence Guerlain Foundation, Center Pompidou, Paris
 2011 - Recent Acquisitions of the Cabinet d'Art Graphique, Center Pompidou, Paris
 2010 - Elles@centrepompidou, Artists women in the collections of the Center Pompidou, Center Pompidou, Paris
 2008 - Subtil Textile, Galleries Gallery, Galeries Lafayette Paris
 2001 - 1 + 1 + 1 + 1 ++ 1 ... Picnic, Museum of Modern Art of Sintra, Portugal
 2000 - Prime Time. "1 + 1 + 1 + 1 ..., Commissioner Pascal Neveux, FRAC Alsace, Sélestat

Collections 
 Municipal Fund of the City of Paris (FMAC), Paris
 Picardie Regional Contemporary Art Fund (FRAC Picardie), Amiens
 Regional Contemporary Art Fund PACA (FRAC PACA), Marseille
 Daniel and Florence Guerlain Foundation, Paris
 Modern and Contemporary Art Museum (MAMCO Geneva), Geneva
National Fund of Contemporary Art, Paris
 Cabinet of Graphic Art, Georges Pompidou Center, Paris
 Antoine de Galbert Collection, The Red House, Paris

References

External links 
 Fabienne Dumont and Pascal Neveux, Paris, Butterfly Gallery, 2017 
 Stéphanie Malbeen, Dessin syncopé, Éditions Le Manuscrit, 2019

1968 births
Living people
21st-century French artists
21st-century French women artists
Artists from Strasbourg
University of Strasbourg alumni
Artists from Marseille